The Indian football champions are the winners of the highest league in Indian men's football, which is now Indian Super League.

Though Indian football tournaments dates back to the eighteenth century, a proper league system was established in 1996 with the commencement of National Football League (NFL). Since its inception in the 1996–97 season, the champions of the NFL were considered as the national champions. However, after the 2006–07 season of the NFL, the league was rebranded as the I-League.  Since 2007–08 season, the I-League champions were considered the national champions until 2016–17 season. Since 2017–18 season the ISL became the joint premier football league of the country along with I-League upto 2021–22 season. Since 2022–23 season ISL became the only top tier football league of the country and hence ISL champions are considered as the national champions. However, the winners of the ISL play-offs are considered as the ISL champions since its inception in 2014.

There are 12 clubs who have won either the National Football League or the I-League and 5 clubs who have won the Indian Super League since the league became the joint top division in India. JCT were the first club to have won any championship, winning the 1996–97 NFL. Mohun Bagan and Dempo are the most successful clubs, winning championships five times each. Mohun Bagan won the NFL thrice and the I-League twice, whereas, Dempo won the NFL twice and the I-League thrice. Also, Bengaluru is the only club who has won both the I-League and the ISL at least once; they won the I-League twice and the ISL once.

History 
The first Indian football league, the National Football League (commonly known as the NFL) was an association football league competition in India which was organised into three divisions. The Premier Division of the league was first introduced in 1996, though the country already had a long history in the sport thanks to the likes of the IFA Shield and the Federation Cup. The league though is now transformed into the  I-League and continues with that name. The change was supposed to bring more popularity to Indian Football. The first league season of I-League consisted of eight teams from the NFL plus two promoted teams from the former Division Two.

The 1996–97 Indian National Football League was the first season of the NFL and ended with JCT Mills FC being crowned champions. The NFL era though saw Kolkata clubs East Bengal and Mohun Bagan had the most championships with three respectively. The I-League era is different though as most of the champions of the league have come from Goa.

Currently the team with the most championships in I-League is Dempo who have won three championships in the league. They are also one of the two teams with the most championships overall along with Mohun Bagan (5 titles each).

In 2014, a new football league named Indian Super League has started. In its first three seasons it was running without recognition from AFC. Before 2017–18 season, ISL get recognition from Asian Football Confederation (AFC). In July 2017, it was proposed by the All India Football Federation (AIFF) that the Indian Super League champion be granted a spot in the AFC Cup, Asia's second-tier club competition. On 25 July 2017, the AFC approved the AIFF's proposal. Thus, from the 2017–18 season, the Indian Super League champions were allowed to participate in the AFC Cup from the qualification stages of the competition. Meanwhile, India's spot in the AFC Champions League, Asia's top club competition, was still kept by the I-League, thus two leagues were parallelly running in the country. In October 2019, a roadmap for development of league in India was proposed. All stakeholders accepted the proposal where it was announced that ISL premiers would now be entitled to the AFC Champions League, starting from 2021 edition and the I-League champion will get to play the AFC Cup.

National League Champions

National Football League (1996–2007)

I-League (2007–2017)

I-League and Indian Super League (2017–2022)
From 2017–18 season until 2021–22 season, I-League and Indian Super League shared joint top flight status in Indian Football

I-League

Indian Super League

Indian Super League (2022–present)

Total titles won
There are 12 clubs who have won either the National Football League or the I-League. There are also 6 clubs who have won the Indian Super League since the league became the joint top division in India.

Teams in bold compete in the Indian Super League for the 2022–23 season.

  - ATK Mohun Bagan is a merger of the football section of multi-sport club Mohun Bagan and former football club ATK
  – Defunct clubs

By state

By city/town

National Cup winners

Federation Cup (1977–2017)

Super Cup (2018–present)

Total Cups won

* : shared
# :There were two federation cups in 1996

Multiple trophy wins

The Double

ISL Double

See also
 List of Indian football first tier top scorers
 List of association football competitions
 Super Cup
 Durand Cup
 I-League
 Indian Super League
 Football in India
 List of Indian women's football champions

References

External links
India – List of National Champions at the RSSSF

Champions
India
Champions
Champions